Operation Logic Bomb: The Ultimate Search & Destroy, known in Japan as  is a 1993 overhead action video game developed and published by Jaleco for the Super NES/Famicom. It was first released in Japan on April 23, 1993, and later in North America in September 1993. It is the second sequel to the Game Boy game Fortified Zone, following the Japan-only Game Boy sequel Ikari no Yōsai 2. Although the Japanese version shares the same title as the original Game Boy game, it is not a remake. It was later re-released as BS Ikari no Yōsai on the Satellaview system. Operation Logic Bomb was added to the Nintendo Switch Online subscription service in May 2020.

Plot
A group of people have joint ambitions to establish an unprecedented scientific theory. They called it the "crystalline substance transfer theory in dimensional physics." This helped to accomplish the rapid progress in recent years. The fear of leaks of confidential material is a huge expense that the leaders could not possibly afford. As a result, all the research was done on expansive grounds in a nationally sponsored facility that was built behind the rocks.

However, because the near future also demands practical research, the people lost contact with the scientists working at the facility. Defense forces are immediately dispatched to an elite survey of troops. A sky reconnaissance plane was shot down last; forcing the area to go into a state of emergency.

Player character
HIRO/Agent Logan
The protagonist of the game. He is assigned the code name "HIRO" after being recruited. HIRO is a warrior whose capabilities are far beyond the limits of normal humans. Through enhancements, he has become an excellent soldier. He is resistant to red bullets while wearing heat-resistant suits that wrap his body and his nervous system.

He is called Agent Logan in the Western release of the game.

Gameplay

The player has to liberate a secret futuristic laboratory dealing with interdimensional physics from monsters that escaped through a rip in the dimensional fabric of space and time. There are many robots and big bosses to fight as the main character liberates his comrades from being trapped inside sections of reality that are turned into a representation of the virtual world.

Controlling a cybernetic soldier, the player starts out with two basic weapons and gains more as he progresses throughout the game. Computer memory banks will permit the player to tap into memories in order to solve the problem once and for all. All of the weapons are essential if the player wishes to beat the game. Enemies include common soldiers, cannon launchers, giant flying robots, and the low amount of continues (3) allowed.

Reception
Allgame gave the game a rating of 3.5 stars out of a possible 5, stating that while it is not as intense as Super Smash T.V. or Contra III: The Alien Wars, it rightfully serves as an intriguing game of "search and destroy."

French magazine Consoles + gave the game a score of 70%.

Super Gamer gave an overall Score of 60% writing "Presentation is slick but the game is too easy, too small and repetitive."

Reviews
Super NES Buyer's Guide
Joypad
Just Games Retro
All Game Guide

References

External links

Operation Logic Bomb at GameFAQs
Ikari no Yōsai at Jaleco 

1993 video games
Action video games
Cooperative video games
Run and gun games
Jaleco games
Science fiction video games
Super Nintendo Entertainment System games
Video games developed in Japan
Nintendo Switch Online games